William Read may refer to:
William Read (priest), Archdeacon of Barnstaple, 1679–1703
William Read (oculist) (1648–1715), quack medical practitioner
William Read (pirate) (died 1701), pirate active in the Indian Ocean near Madagascar
William Brown Read (1817–1880), American politician and lawyer from Kentucky
William Henry Macleod Read (1819–1909), British businessman and public servant in Singapore
William Read (Australian politician) (1882–1974), Australian politician
William Ronald Read (1885–1972), British Royal Air Force officer of the First World War
William L. Read, American meteorologist

See also
William Reid (disambiguation)
William Reed (disambiguation)
William Read Scurry (1821–1864), General in the Confederate States Army in the American Civil War
William Read Miller (1823–1887), Democratic Governor of the State of Arkansas
William Rede (disambiguation)
William Reade (disambiguation)